The Proto-Elamite period, also known as Susa III, is a chronological era in the ancient history of the area of Elam, dating from . In archaeological terms this corresponds to the late Banesh period. Proto-Elamite sites are recognized as the oldest civilization in the territory of present-day Iran.

The Proto-Elamite script is an Early Bronze Age writing system briefly in use before the introduction of Elamite cuneiform.

History

Background 
During the period 8000–3700 BC, the Fertile Crescent witnessed the spread of small settlements supported by agricultural surplus. Geometric tokens emerged to be used to manage stewardship of this surplus. The earliest tokens now known are those from two sites in the Zagros region of Iran: Tepe Asiab and Ganj-i-Dareh Tepe.

The Mesopotamian civilization emerged during the period 3700–2900 BC amid the development of technological innovations such as the plough, sailing boats, and copper metal working. Clay tablets with pictographic characters appeared in this period to record commercial transactions performed by the temples.

Proto-Elamite sites 
The most important Proto-Elamite sites are Susa and Anshan. Another important site is Tepe Sialk, where the only remaining Proto-Elamite ziggurat is still seen. Texts in the undeciphered Proto-Elamite script found in Susa are dated to this period. It was originally assumed that the Proto-Elamites were in fact Elamites (Elamite speakers), because of cultural similarities (for example, the building of ziggurats), and because no large-scale migration to this area seems to have occurred between the Proto-Elamite period and the later Elamites. As Proto-Elamite writing has now been found over a wider area that is less certain.

Proto-Elamite pottery dating back to the last half of the 5th millennium BC has been found in Tepe Sialk, where Proto-Elamite writing, the first form of writing in Iran, has been found on tablets of this date. The first cylinder seals come from the Proto-Elamite period, as well.

Some anthropologists, such as John Alden, maintain that Proto-Elamite influence grew rapidly at the end of the 4th millennium BC and declined equally rapidly with the establishment of maritime trade in the Persian Gulf several centuries later.

Proto-Elamite script 

A few Proto-Elamite signs seem either to be loans from the slightly older proto-cuneiform (Late Uruk) tablets of Mesopotamia, or perhaps more likely, to share a common origin in the earliest 4th millennium numeral tablets: both systems share a few common signs, particularly related to numerals and the objects they counted (such as slaves, females, pots...). Otherwise, the two scripts are quite different, using entirely different signs. The writing style also is different: whereas proto-cuneiform is written in visual hierarchies (boxes), Proto-Elamite is written in an in-line style. In Proto-Elamite numerical signs follow the objects they count; some non-numerical signs are 'images' of the objects they represent, although the majority are entirely abstract.

Basic numerical tablets with pictorials for the objects being counted (numerical tablets and numero-logogrammatic tablets) have been carbon dated to 3500-3000 BCE, from the sites of Godin Tepe, Habuba Kabira, Jebel Aruda, Tell Brak and Tepe Hissar. These early numerical tablets are similar to those found in Mesopotamia. Proper Proto-Elamite was used soon after, for a brief period between 3300 and 3000 BCE (circa the Jemdet Nasr period of Mesopotamia).

Linear Elamite is attested much later in the last quarter of the 3rd millennium BCE. It is uncertain whether the Proto-Elamite script was the direct predecessor of Linear Elamite. Both scripts remain largely undeciphered, and a postulated relationship between the two is speculative.

Proponents of an Elamo-Dravidian relationship have looked for similarities between the Proto-Elamite script and the Indus script.

Early on, similarities were noted between Proto-Elamite and the Cretan Linear A script.

Inscription corpus
The Proto-Elamite writing system was used over a very large geographical area, stretching from Susa in the west, to Tepe Yahya in the east, and perhaps beyond. The known corpus of inscriptions consists of some 1600 tablets, the vast majority unearthed at Susa.

Proto-Elamite tablets have been found at the following sites (in order of number of tablets recovered):
Susa (more than 1500 tablets)
Anshan, or Malyan (more than 30 tablets)
Tepe Yahya (27 tablets)
Tepe Sialk (22 tablets)
Tape Sofalin (12 tablets and fragments
Jiroft (two tablets)
Ozbaki (one tablet)
Shahr-e Sukhteh (one tablet)

None of the inscribed objects from Ghazir, Chogha Mish or Hissar can be verified as Proto-Elamite; the tablets from Ghazir and Choga Mish are Uruk IV style or numerical tablets, whereas the Hissar object cannot be classified at present. The majority of the Tepe Sialk tablets are also not proto-Elamite, strictly speaking, but belong to the period of close contact between Mesopotamia and Iran, presumably corresponding to Uruk V - IV.

Decipherment attempts 
In 2020, of the Laboratoire Archéorient (Lyon, France), announced a proposed decipherment and translation of proto-Elamite texts. As yet no scholarly paper has been published on this proposal.

Although the decipherment of Proto-Elamite has remains uncertain, the content of many texts is known. This is possible because certain signs, and in particular a majority of the numerical signs, are similar to the neighboring Mesopotamian writing system, proto-cuneiform. In addition, a number of the proto-Elamite signs are actual images of the objects they represent. However, the majority of the proto-Elamite signs are entirely abstract, and their meanings can only be deciphered through careful graphotactical analysis.

While the Elamite language has been suggested as a likely candidate underlying the Proto-Elamite inscriptions, there is no positive evidence of this. The earliest Proto-Elamite inscriptions, being purely ideographical, do not in fact contain any linguistic information, and following Friberg's 1978/79 study of Ancient Near Eastern metrology, decipherment attempts have moved away from linguistic methods.

In 2012, Dr Jacob Dahl of the Faculty of Oriental Studies, University of Oxford, announced a project to make high-quality images of Proto-Elamite clay tablets and publish them online. His hope is that crowdsourcing by academics and amateurs working together would be able to understand the script, despite the presence of mistakes and the lack of phonetic clues. Dahl assisted in making the images of nearly 1600 Proto-Elamite tablets online. Materials were put online on a wiki of the Cuneiform Digital Library Initiative.

Proto-Elamite cylinder seals
Proto-Elamite seals follow the seals of the Uruk period, with which they share many stylistic elements, but display more individuality and a more lively rendering.

See also 

 History of Iran
 Jiroft culture

References

Literature 

 Logan Born et al., "Compositionality of Complex Graphemes in the Undeciphered Proto-Elamite Script using Image and Text Embedding Models" in Findings of the Association for Computational Linguistics: ACL-IJCNLP 2021, pp. 3136–3146 August 2021
 Jacob L. Dahl, "Complex Graphemes in Proto-Elamite," in Cuneiform Digital Library Journal (CDLJ) 2005:3. Download a PDF copy
  Jacob L. Dahl, "The proto-Elamite seal MDP 16, pl. XII fig. 198",  in Cuneiform Digital Library Notes, CDLN 2014:1, 2014
  Jacob L. Dahl, "New and old joins in the Louvre proto-Elamite tablet collection",  in Cuneiform Digital Library Notes, CDLN 2012:6, 2012
 Dahl, Jacob L, "Animal Husbandry in Susa during the Proto-Elamite Period" SMEA, vol.47, pp. 81–134, 2005
 Peter Damerow, “The Origins of Writing as a Problem of Historical Epistemology,” in Cuneiform Digital Library Journal (CDLJ) 2006:1. Download a PDF copy
 Peter Damerow and Robert K. Englund, The Proto-Elamite Texts from Tepe Yahya, The American School of Prehistoric Research Bulletin 39; Cambridge, MA, 1989
 Englund, R.K, "The Proto-Elamite Script," in: Peter Daniels and William Bright, eds. The World's Writing Systems (1996). New York/Oxford, pp. 160–164, 1996
 Robert H. Dyson, “Early Work on the Acropolis at Susa. The Beginning of Prehistory in Iraq and Iran,” Expedition 10/4 (1968) 21–34.
 Jöran Friberg, The Third Millennium Roots of Babylonian Mathematics I-II (Göteborg, 1978/79).
 Hansen, Donald, et al. “A Proto-Elamite Silver Figurine in the Metropolitan Museum of Art.” Metropolitan Museum Journal, vol. 3, 1970, pp. 5–26
 Laura F. Hawkins, "A New Edition of the Proto-Elamite Text MDP 17", Cuneiform Digital Library Journal, CDLJ 2015:001, 2015
 A. Le Brun, “Recherches stratigraphiques a l’acropole de Suse, 1969-1971,” in  Cahiers de la Délégation archaéologique Française en Iran 1  (= CahDAFI 1; Paris, 1971) 163 – 216.
 Piero Meriggi, La scritura proto-elamica. Parte Ia: La scritura e il contenuto dei testi (Rome, 1971).
 Piero Meriggi, La scritura proto-elamica. Parte IIa: Catalogo dei segni (Rome, 1974).
 Piero Meriggi, La scritura proto-elamica. Parte IIIa: Testi (Rome, 1974).
 Daniel T. Potts, The Archaeology of Elam (Cambridge, UK, 1999).
 Saeedi, Sepideh, Proto-Elamite Communities under the Magnifying Glass , in: Abar, Aydin et al. (Hrsg.): Pearls, Politics and Pistachios: Essays in Anthropology and Memories on the Occasion of Susan Pollock's 65th Birthday, Heidelberg: Propylaeum, 2021, pp. 61–87. 
 Sax, M., and A. P. Middleton. "The Use of Volcanic Tuff as a Raw Material for Proto-Elamite Cylinder Seals." Iran, vol. 27, 1989, pp. 121–23
  Francois Vallat, The Most Ancient Scripts of Iran: The Current Situation,  World Archaeology, vol. 17, no. 3, Early Writing Systems, pp. 335–347, (Feb., 1986)

External links
Interview with Francois Desset on his proposed decipherment - The Postil Magazine - Sep 2021
Cuneiform Digital Library Initiative Cuneiform Digital Library Initiative
 (crowdsourcing materials)
Graphic, with article, of a Proto-Elamite tablet
Art of the Bronze Age: Southeastern Iran, Western Central Asia, and the Indus Valley, an exhibition catalog from The Metropolitan Museum of Art (fully available online as PDF), which contains material on Proto-Elamite culture
Preliminary proposal to encode ProtoElamite in Unicode - Anshuman Pandey 2020

4th millennium BC
3rd millennium BC
Bronze Age writing systems
Elamite language
Jiroft culture
Obsolete writing systems
States and territories disestablished in the 3rd millennium BC
States and territories established in the 4th millennium BC
Undeciphered writing systems